Robidoux Row is a historic apartment building located at 219-225 East Poulin Street in St. Joseph, Missouri.  It was built by St. Joseph founder Joseph Robidoux in north St. Joseph in the late 1840s/early 1850s. It is a -story brick structure with an attached single story brick building. Robidoux lived there at one point. The Saint Joseph Historical Society has renovated the building and operates it as a local history museum.

It was added to the National Register of Historic Places in 1973.

References

External links
 Robidoux Row Museum - official site of the Saint Joseph Historical Society

Residential buildings on the National Register of Historic Places in Missouri
Residential buildings completed in 1849
Buildings and structures in St. Joseph, Missouri
Museums in St. Joseph, Missouri
History museums in Missouri
National Register of Historic Places in Buchanan County, Missouri